Capitan Miki (translation: Captain Miki) is an Italian comic book, created by the trio EsseGesse. Miki was first published in Italy on 1 July 1951. It gained a great commercial success, selling over 500.000 copies per week and launching the careers of its three authors.

Plot 
Miki is a young boy who, after carrying out a number of successful missions is promoted, in spite of his young age, to the rank of captain of rangers in Nevada. Miki has a young fiancée, Susy, the daughter of the fort commandant. His best friends are  Doppio Rhum (Double Rum) and Dottor Salasso (Doctor bloodletting). Doppio Rhum was inspired by the actor Gabby Hayes in many western films of the 1930s and 1940s, and Dottor Salasso by the drunken Doc, portrayed by Thomas Mitchell in the classic western film Stagecoach (1939).

References 

1951 comics debuts
1967 comics endings
Child characters in comics
Comics characters introduced in 1951
Fictional characters from Nevada
Fictional military captains
Fictional United States Army Rangers personnel
Italian comics characters
Italian comics titles
Western (genre) comics